The Department of the Environment, Climate and Communications is a department of the Government of Ireland that is responsible for the telecommunications and broadcasting sectors and regulates, protects and develops the natural resources of Ireland. The head of the department is the Minister for the Environment, Climate and Communications.

Departmental team
The official headquarters and ministerial offices of the department are at Adelaide Road, Dublin. The departmental team consists of the following:

Minister for the Environment, Climate and Communications: Eamon Ryan, TD
Minister of State at the Department of the Environment, Climate and Communications, with special responsibility for Postal Policy and Eircodes: Jack Chambers, TD
Minister of State at the Department of the Environment, Climate and Communications, with special responsibility for Communications and the Circular economy: Ossian Smyth, TD
Secretary General of the Department: Mark Griffin

Structure
The Department of Environment, Climate and Communications is subdivided into the following divisions:
Climate – The Department has three major aims regarding climate change: To develop a competitive energy supply industry, to ensure security and reliability of energy supply, and to develop energy conservation and end-use efficiency.
Communications – The core policy objective of the Communications Sector is to contribute to sustained macro-economic growth and competitiveness and ensure that the Republic of Ireland is best placed to avail of the emerging opportunities provided by the information and knowledge society, by promoting investment in state-of-the-art infrastructures, by providing a supportive legislative and regulatory environment and by developing a leading edge research and development reputation in the information, communications and digital technologies.
Natural Resources – This division is subdivided into three sectors: the Exploration and Mining Division, Petroleum Affairs Division, and the Geological Survey of Ireland.

Affiliated bodies
Among the State Agencies and other bodies affiliated to the Department in some way are:
Commission for Energy Regulation
Commission for Communications Regulation
National Cyber Security Centre
Digital Hub Development Agency
National Digital Research Centre
Geological Survey of Ireland
Mining Board
Sustainable Energy Authority of Ireland
National Oil Reserves Agency
Central and Regional Fisheries Boards
Loughs Agency of the Foyle, Carlingford and Irish Lights Commission (North/South body)

Among the state-sponsored bodies of the Republic of Ireland under the aegis of the Minister are:
Electricity Supply Board
Bord na Móna
EirGrid
An Post
Irish National Petroleum Corporation

History
The Department of Fisheries was created in 1921 during the Ministry of Dáil Éireann. It was given a statutory basis by the Ministers and Secretaries Act 1924, soon after the establishment of the Irish Free State in 1922. This act provided it with:

The Schedule assigned it with the duties of the following bodies:
Department of Agriculture and Technical Instruction for Ireland—Fisheries Branch.
Congested Districts Board for Ireland—Fisheries Branch, and Rural Industries Branch.
The Conservators of Fisheries.

Alteration of name and transfer of functions
The name and functions of the department have changed several times by statutory instruments.

References

External links
Department of the Environment, Climate and Communications

 
Ireland
Telecommunications in the Republic of Ireland
Communications in the Republic of Ireland
Energy in the Republic of Ireland
Ministries established in 1921
Ireland
Environment
Ireland
1921 establishments in Ireland
Environment of the Republic of Ireland
Ireland
Ireland